1in6 is an American nonprofit organization that provides support and information to male survivors of sexual abuse and assault, as well as their loved ones and service providers.

In January 2007, 1in6 was founded by a group of individuals including Steve LePore, Jim Hopper, Greg LeMond, and David Lisak. In December 2018, the Board of Directors of 1in6 announced that longtime nonprofit leader Matthew Ennis would succeed founder Steve LePore as the organization's President & Chief Executive Officer following LePore's retirement.

The organization partners with RAINN to provide a free and anonymous 24/7 helpline, as well as confidential weekly online support groups for male survivors. In 2016, nearly 400,000 people visited the 1in6 website. The Bristlecone Project, created by Lisak, is 1in6’s multimedia awareness campaign that features portraits and stories of a community of male survivors.

Based in Los Angeles, the organization conducts trainings for professionals, organizations, and military branches around the world, including the US Navy, US Army, US Air Force, and the US Marine Corps. 1in6 also provides technical support for various organizations including RAINN, Pennsylvania Coalition Against Rape, ECPAT International, National Sexual Violence Resource Center, Your Safe Haven, Centre County Women’s Resource Center, Men Can Stop Rape, Victim Services Incorporated, Family Services of Blair County, and all branches of the United States Military at bases around the world.

NO MORE Celebrity PSA Campaign - Male Survivors

In 2016, 1in6 partnered with Viacom, NO MORE, and The Joyful Heart Foundation (founded by Mariska Hargitay) to produce public service announcements featuring celebrities and highlighting the prevalence of sexual trauma among males. On March 2, 2016, the broadcast PSAs debuted on Viacom’s networks and in Times Square, during which the PSAs were visible to approximately 21 million people.

See also 
 List of anti-sexual assault organizations in the United States

References

External links 
Official website
The Bristlecone Project

Sexual abuse advocacy and support groups
Incestual abuse
Rape in the United States
Online support groups
Men's organizations in the United States
Organizations established in 2007
Organizations based in Los Angeles
Violence against men in North America